Daintes Abbia "Danny" Livingstone (born St. John's, Antigua and Barbuda, 21 September 1933, died in St John's, 8 September 1988) was an Antiguan first-class cricketer working in England. He played with Hampshire from 1959 until 1972. He also represented the International Cavaliers and a Commonwealth XI.

His highest score was 200 for Hampshire against Surrey in 1962, when he and Alan Castell put on 230 for the ninth wicket after Hampshire had been 128 for 8.

Life after cricket 

He returned to Antigua when he retired from playing, and worked for the government as Director of Sports. After returning to Antigua he was married and was the father of five children.

References

External links
Danny Livingstone at Cricket Archive
Danny Livingstone at Cricinfo

1933 births
1988 deaths
English cricketers
Hampshire cricketers
Commonwealth XI cricketers
International Cavaliers cricketers
D. H. Robins' XI cricketers